The Amphitheater Lake Trail is a  long hiking trail in Grand Teton National Park in the U.S. state of Wyoming. At the  point, the trail forks and the Garnet Canyon Trail heads south and then west into Garnet Canyon. Shortly before arriving at Amphitheater Lake, hikers pass Surprise Lake where there is a backcountry camping site available if one obtains a free permit. Amphitheater Lake is southwest of Disappointment Peak.

See also
List of hiking trails in Grand Teton National Park

References

Hiking trails of Grand Teton National Park